Actin-like protein 6A is a protein that in humans is encoded by the ACTL6A gene.

Function 

This gene encodes a family member of actin-related proteins (ARPs), which share significant amino acid sequence identity to conventional actins. Both actins and ARPs have an actin fold, which is an ATP-binding cleft, as a common feature. The ARPs are involved in diverse cellular processes, including vesicular transport, spindle orientation, nuclear migration and chromatin remodeling. This gene encodes a 53 kDa subunit protein of the BAF (BRG1/brm-associated factor) complex in mammals, which is functionally related to SWI/SNF complex in S. cerevisiae and Drosophila; the latter is thought to facilitate transcriptional activation of specific genes by antagonizing chromatin-mediated transcriptional repression. Together with beta-actin, it is required for maximal ATPase activity of BRG1, and for the association of the BAF complex with chromatin/matrix. Three transcript variants that encode two different protein isoforms have been described.

Clinical significance 

ACTL6A is amplified in head and squamous cancers and confers poor prognosis in patients. In hepatocellular carcinomas, it promotes metastasis.

Interactions 

ACTL6A has been shown to interact with SMARCA2, Myc, Transformation/transcription domain-associated protein, RuvB-like 1 and SMARCA4.

References

Further reading 

 
 
 
 
 
 
 
 
 
 
 
 
 
 
 
 
 

Human proteins